Vangas are a group of birds found in Madagascar and Comoros, usually classified as the family Vangidae (including a list of birds in the family).

Vanga may also refer to:
 Vanga, Kenya, a village in Msambweni Constituency on the coast near the Tanzanian border
 Vanga, Kwilu, a village in the Democratic Republic of Congo
 Baba Vanga (1911–1996), Bulgarian prophetess
 Vanga Kingdom, an ancient kingdom in Bengal
 Vaṅga, the Sanskrit name for East Bengal

See also
 
 Banga (disambiguation)